Carlos Antonio Cañizales Civira (born 11 March 1993) is a Venezuelan professional boxer who held the WBA (Regular) light flyweight title from 2018 until 2021.

Professional career

WBA light–flyweight champion
Cañizales was scheduled to face Reiya Konishi for the vacant WBA (Regular) light flyweight title on 18 March 2018, at the Portopia Hotel in Kobe, Japan, and was broadcast by Fuji TV NEXT domestically. Cañizales was at the time the #1 ranked WBA light-flyweight contender, while Konishi came in as the #2 ranked contender. Cañizales won the fight by unanimous decision, with scores of 116–111, 115–112 and 114–113. The pivotal moment came in the third round when Cañizales knocked Konishi down with a right, which ended up putting Cañizales ahead on two of the judges' scorecards.

Cañizales made his first WBA Regular light-flyweight title defense against Lü Bin, in what was Bin's second professional bout, following a moderately successful amateur career. The title fight was scheduled for the undercard of the Manny Pacquiao vs. Lucas Matthysse welterweight championship fight on 15 July 2018. Cañizales began to take over from the fourth round onward, and knocked Bin down with a right in the eleventh round, which also opened a cut above his right eye. Cañizales knocked Bin down once more in the twelfth round, which forced referee Gustavo Padilla to stop the fight at the very last second.

Cañizales made his second title defense against the former WBO flyweight champion Sho Kimura on 26 May 2019 at the Fuzhou Sports Center Gymnasium in Fuzhou, China. The bout was streamed by the WBA on their website. Cañizalez won the fight by a dominant unanimous decision, with scores of 118–110, 119–109 and 119–109.

Cañizales was scheduled to make his third title defense against Esteban Bermudez on 28 May 2021, following a two-year absence from the sport. Bermudez won the fight by a sixth-round knockout. He staggered Cañizales with an overhead right, and dropped him with a right hook shortly after. Although Cañizales was able to beat the eight count, he was knocked out just two seconds later.

Post title-reign
Cañizales was scheduled to face German Valenzuela on 29 October 2021, in his first fight post title loss. He won the fight by unanimous decision, with scores of 98–92, 98–92 and 99–91. Cañizales dominated from the start, managing to outwork the taller Valenzuela for the majority of the fight.

On January 27, 2022, the WBA allowed Esteban Bermudez to make a voluntary title defense against Cañizales, as Kyoguchi withdrew from a scheduled purse bid due to an injury. However, Cañizales opted to face Ganigan López for the vacant WBA Continental Americas flyweight title on 26 March 2022. He won the fight by a fourth-round knockout, flooring López with a right hook at the 1:45 minute mark.

Cañizales faced Armando Torres for the vacant WBA Fedecaribe flyweight title on August 20, 2022, at the Blackberry Auditorium in Mexico City, Mexico. He won the fight by a first-round technical knockout, as Torres' corner threw in the towel at the 2:05 minute mark of the opening round.

Professional boxing record

See also
List of world light-flyweight boxing champions

References

External links

Carlos Canizales - Profile, News Archive & Current Rankings at Box.Live

1993 births
Living people
Light-flyweight boxers
World light-flyweight boxing champions
World Boxing Association champions
Sportspeople from Caracas
Venezuelan male boxers